Robert E. Glazebrook (born March 7, 1956) is a former professional American football player who played safety for six seasons for the Atlanta Falcons.

He attended Hoover High School in Fresno, California. He currently resides in South Carolina with his wife Sharon. They have four kids: Stephan (married), Mara (married), Norie (married), and Rachel.

1956 births
Living people
Sportspeople from Fresno, California
Players of American football from California
American football safeties
Atlanta Falcons players
Fresno State Bulldogs football players